Horatio Nelson (2003 – 3 June 2006) was a racehorse sired by Danehill, out of the Irish 1,000 Guineas and Epsom Oaks winner Imagine. His owners were John Magnier and David Nagle. The colt won four of his seven starts, including the Prix Jean-Luc Lagardère at Longchamp Racecourse in October 2005. He competed in the 2006 Epsom Derby but broke down during the race and was later euthanized. He sustained a fractured cannon bone, a sesamoid bone and a dislocated fetlock joint on his right fore leg.

References

2003 racehorse births
2006 racehorse deaths
Thoroughbred family 4-n
Racehorses bred in Ireland
Racehorses trained in Ireland